Puerto Rico Highway 130 (PR-130) is the main north–south route within the municipality of Hatillo, Puerto Rico.

Route description
The highway starts from the downtown area (from PR-119), crossing the neighborhoods of Capáez, Naranjito, Buena Vista and Campo Alegre until it ends at Carretera Mariana Bracetti (PR-129). In downtown, the highway runs through Calle Luis H. Lacomba and Avenida Pablo J. Aguilar until it crosses PR-2 in a southerly direction. This route is part of the caravan of the Hatillo Mask Festival.

Major intersections

See also

 List of highways numbered 130

References

External links
 

130
Hatillo, Puerto Rico